Miika Hietanen (born 27 January 1968) is a Finnish former racing cyclist. He won the Finnish national road race title in 1997 and 1999.

Major results

1991
 3rd Vlaamse Havenpijl
1992
 1st Grand Prix des Marbriers
 1st Stage 6 Circuit Franco-Belge
 3rd Paris–Tours Espoirs
1993
 3rd Overall Circuit Franco-Belge
1st Stage 6
1994
 1st  Time trial, National Road Championships
1995
 1st Circuito de Getxo
1997
 National Road Championships
1st  Time trial
1st  Road race
1998
 National Road Championships
1st  Time trial
3rd Road race
 1st  Overall Ronde de l'Oise
1999
 National Road Championships
1st  Time trial
1st  Road race
 5th Lincoln Grand Prix
2000
 1st Paris–Chauny
2001
 1st Stage 3 Tour Nord-Isère
2003
 2nd Grand Prix Cristal Energie

References

External links

1968 births
Living people
Finnish male cyclists
Sportspeople from Helsinki